Senegalia densispina is a species of plant in the family Fabaceae. It is found only in Somalia. It is threatened by habitat loss.

References

densispina
Flora of Somalia
Vulnerable plants
Endemic flora of Somalia
Taxonomy articles created by Polbot